Francisco Rovira Rullán (born October 2, 1977, in San Juan, Puerto Rico) is an art dealer, active from a young age. He has worked for the Ronald S. Lauder Collection (NYC), in the Museo de Arte Contemporáneo de Puerto Rico, the Isabella Stewart Gardner Museum (Boston) and M&M Proyectos (San Juan, Puerto Rico) among other institutions and companies.

In 2003, Rovira Rullán founded Galeria Comercial, an exhibit house that rapidly became one of the most important galleries in Puerto Rico due to its curatorial focus and the quality of the artists represented. Rovira Rullan not only built a reputation for exhibiting unknown artists working on non-traditional media, but also managed to insert them successfully into the international art fair circuit (Art Basel, NADA Art Fair, Art Basel Miami Beach), biennials (Whitney Biennial, Torino Triennial), collaborating with galleries (CANADA, Nicole Klasgbrun Gallery) and specialized critique (Flash Art, NY Times, ArtNet, Journal des Arts).

Founded in 2011, Roberto Paradise is his latest art adventure. Fast-paced, Rovira Rullán has placed his new project and artists in the international art fair circuit (ARCOmadrid, NADA Miami, NADA New York), biennials and museum exhibitions (Whitney Biennial, Museum of Contemporary Art Detroit, Museum of Contemporary Art Chicago, Sala de Arte Publico Siqueiros Mexico) media (for example, Huffington Post, LA Times, Flash Art, New York Times, El País, Modern Painters, Beautiful Decay) and participated in collaborations with prestigious galleries around the world (Andrea Rosen Gallery, ltd Los Angeles and Josh Lilley Gallery to name a few).

Since February 2014, Roberto Paradise has been a member of the New Art Dealers Alliance.

References

Agencia EFE: Roberto Paradise eleva panorama artistico
MSN Latinoamerica: Roberto Paradise al rescate del arte puertorriqueno
El Pais: Premio a la creacion Sanjuanera
ABC.ES: Contra la crisis, Arte conceptual hispano
Latin Times: Latinos in the US
Vision Doble: Tropicalizar el Whitney
Huffington Post: What is it about Roberto Paradise
El Nuevo Dia: Roberto Paradise en la NADA
ArtSlant: ArtSlant Prize 2014 Jurors
ArtSlant: Alter Ego
Roberto Paradise: PRESS
CRITIC'S NOTEBOOK; A Carnival of Art, Money, Surf and Sand
Official Site
36 Hours in San Juan
Art in Review
Center for the Aesthetic Revolution
E-Flux
Whitney Biennal 2006
Royal College of Art Events
Royal College of Art Events
RCA Exhibitors
ART LA 2007
Art Bassel Miami
Rotund World

Living people
People from San Juan, Puerto Rico
American art dealers
1977 births